Procanace is a genus of beach flies (insects in the family Canacidae). All known species are Oriental, Afrotropical, Palaearctic, Neotropical  or Australasian.

Identification
They are the only Nocticanacinae where the interfrontal setae are absent.

Species

P. acuminata Hardy and Delfinado, 1980
P. aestuaricola Miyagi, 1965
P. bifurcata Hardy and Delfinado, 1980
P. canzonerii Mathis and Freidberg, 1991
P. cogani Mathis, 1988
P. confusa Hardy and Delfinado, 1980
P. constricta Hardy and Delfinado, 1980
P. cressoni Wirth, 1951
P. dianneae Mathis, 1988
P. flavescens Miyagi, 1965
P. flaviantennalis Miyagi, 1965
P. fulva Miyagi, 1965
P. gressitti Delfinado, 1970
P. grisescens Hendel, 1913
P. hendeli Delfinado, 1971
P. mcalpinei [sic] Mathis, 1996
P. macquariensis Womersley, 1937
P. nakazatoi Miyagi, 1965
P. nigroviridis Cresson, 1926
P. novaeguineae Delfinado, 1970
P. opaca de Meijere, 1916
P. pauliani Mathis and Wirth, 1979
P. pninae Mathis and Freidberg, 1991
P. quadrisetosa Hardy and Delfinado, 1980
P. rivalis Miyagi, 1965
P. suigoensis Miyagi, 1965
P. taiwanensis Delfinado, 1971
P. townesi Wirth, 1951
P. williamsi Wirth, 1951
P. wirthi Hardy and Delfinado, 1980

References

Canacidae
Carnoidea genera